Climate Nexus is a non-profit journalism and climate communication organization. The organization is primarily focused on the role of the United States in Climate Change. Material from their reporting has been used by a number of national and international publications, through their network Nexus Media News. Climate Nexus was formed in 2011. Initial support to the group was from the Skoll Foundation.

References

Websites 

 

Climate communication